The Indian Premier League (IPL) is a domestic, annual Twenty20 cricket tournament in India, organized by the IPL Governing Council, under the aegis of the Board of Control for Cricket in India (BCCI). It is the most watched Twenty20 tournament and the second-best paying sporting league globally.

IPL was established in 2008 and currently consists of ten teams in ten cities across India.The inaugural IPL season was won by Rajasthan Royals. As of May 2022, there have been fifteen seasons of the IPL tournament. The latest season was conducted with Gujarat Titans winning their  first title.

The IPL tournament involves each team playing every other team twice in a home-and-away, double round-robin format. At the conclusion of the double round-robin league, on the basis of aggregate points, the top four teams qualify for the playoffs. In this stage, the top two teams compete with each other (in a match titled "Qualifier 1"), as do the remaining two teams (in a match titled "Eliminator"). While the winner of Qualifier 1 directly qualifies for the final match, the losing team gets another chance to qualify for the final match by playing the winning team of the Eliminator match; this match is titled Qualifier 2. The winner of this subsequent Qualifier 2 match moves onto the final match. The team that wins the final match is crowned the Indian Premier League champion.

Altogether, thirteen teams have played in the past ten seasons of the IPL tournament. Of these, five teams are no longer a part of the tournament. In 2011, BCCI terminated the franchise of Kochi Tuskers Kerala for contractual breach. Similarly, BCCI terminated the franchise of Deccan Chargers in 2012 for backing off from its commitments. In 2013, Pune Warriors India exited IPL after it had a franchise valuation disagreement with BCCI. Chennai Super Kings and Rajasthan Royals were suspended in 2015 & 2016 following a betting controversy. However, in July 2017, BCCI announced that both Chennai Super Kings and Rajasthan Royals would be allowed back into the IPL competition from the 2018 season. The tournament featured eight teams for the 2020 season, including Delhi Capitals, Punjab Kings, Kolkata Knight Riders, Royal Challengers Bangalore, Rajasthan Royals, Chennai Super Kings, Sunrisers Hyderabad and Mumbai Indians.

Mumbai Indians have won five titles. Chennai Super Kings have won four titles and Kolkata Knight Riders have won two titles, Sunrisers Hyderabad and Rajasthan Royals, apart from former team Deccan Chargers, are the other teams to have won the tournament title as of June 2022.

Tournament seasons and results

Overall season results

 List of Teams with Most Losses in IPL History

 List of Teams with Most Wins in IPL History

Overall team results

*No longer exists.

Additional team statistics

See also
 List of Indian Premier League records and statistics
 List of Indian Premier League captains
 List of Indian Premier League centuries
 List of Indian Premier League five-wicket hauls
 List of Indian Premier League umpires
 List of Indian Premier League players

Notes and references

Notes

References

External links 

 
 Live IPL Website



Indian Premier League
Cricket leagues in India
Sports leagues established in 2008
Indian Premier League lists
Indian cricket lists